The Zhengzhou Airport Expressway, designated as S1 in Henan's expressway system, is  in Zhengzhou, Henan, China. The expressway connects Zhengzhou city center to Zhengzhou Xinzheng International Airport.

History

The expressway was initially a section of the Zhengzhou–Xuchang Expressway, which was opened in the mid 1990s as a section of the Beijing–Zhuhai Expressway (Jingzhu Expressway, the G030 expressway then). On 1 October 2004, with the completion of the Xinxiang–Xuedian section of the Jingzhu Expressway, this expressway was dedicated to serve as a link between Zhengzhou city center and Zhengzhou Xinzheng International Airport and was re-designated as S1 in Henan's expressway system.

During 2014-2016, the expressway underwent a renovation project, which widened it from 4 lanes to 8 lanes.

Route
The S1 expressway starts at the interchange of Zhongzhou Avenue and Longhai Expressway as an eight-lane controlled-access expressway. It then heads southeast, intersecting with Hanghai E. Road and South 3rd Ring Road before becoming a tolled expressway at Zhengzhou South Toll Station. It meets G3001 Zhengzhou Ring Expressway near Xiangyunsi, and then runs in parallel to G4 Beijing–Hong Kong and Macau Expressway just to its west.

Road conditions

Speed Limit
The maximum speed limit is 120 km/h for the left two lanes and 100 km/h for the right two lanes. The minimum speed limit is 60 km/h.

Tolls
￥10 will be charged for vehicles using this expressway. (Zhengzhou South Toll Station–Xinzheng Airport Toll Gate)

Lanes
8 lanes. (4 lanes for each direction)

Surface conditions
The road surface was paved in asphalt.

List of exits

References

Expressways in Henan
Transport in Henan
Expressways in Zhengzhou